The RBCC, or rocket-based combined cycle propulsion system, was one of the two types of propulsion systems that may have been tested in the Boeing X-43 experimental aircraft.  The RBCC, or strutjet as it is sometimes called, is a combination propulsion system that consists of a ramjet, scramjet, and ducted rocket, where all three systems use a shared flow path.

A TBCC, or turbine-based combined cycle propulsion system, is a turbine engine combined with a ramjet and scramjet.

A TRCC, or turbo rocket combined cycle propulsion system, is another combination propulsion system that combines an afterburning turbine engine with a RBCC propulsion system.

See also
 SABRE (Synergistic Air Breathing Rocket Engine), a pre-cooled air-breathing rocket/RAM-jet engine based on General Dynamics' exploration of LACE concepts (Liquid Air Cycle Engine) by Reaction Engines, UK.

References

External links
 Performance Evaluation of the NASA GTX RBCC Flowpath  - Glenn Research Center - NASA
 Parametric Study Conducted of Rocket-Based, Combined-Cycle Nozzles - Glenn Research Center - NASA
 Aerojet Successfully Tests RBCC Single Thruster, Demonstrating Tri-Fluid Rocket Injector Capabilities -  SpaceRef
 Hypersonic inlet studies for a small-scale rocket-based combined-cycle engine, Journal of propulsion and power, 2007, vol. 23, no6, pp. 1160–1167, AIAA.
 Rocket-Based Combined-Cycle Engine (RBCC): Ramrocket, University of Toronto, High-Speed Vehicle Propulsion Systems Group.

Jet engines